Suzanne Nam (born January 29, 1974) is an American journalist and a former attorney.

Background

Nam graduated from Northeastern University and has a Juris Doctor degree from the Boston College Law School, where she was a member of the Law Review. She practised law for five years, spending part of the time in London, before moving to New York City, where she graduated with a master's degree from the Columbia University Graduate School of Journalism.

Nam currently writes for Forbes magazine   and has also written travel books about Thailand and Bangkok for Moon Publications. She is currently working on her third book.

Personal

Nam was born in New York City and lives in Bangkok, Thailand. Her husband, John Brown, is CEO of Agoda.com.

Publications

Books

References

Living people
1974 births
20th-century American lawyers
21st-century American journalists
21st-century American lawyers
American people of Korean descent
American women journalists
Boston College Law School alumni
Columbia University Graduate School of Journalism alumni
Northeastern University alumni
People from New York City
20th-century American women
21st-century American women